Brady Boswell (born April 18, 1997) is an American professional stock car racing driver. He most recently competed part-time in the ARCA Menards Series and the NASCAR Gander RV & Outdoors Truck Series for Mason Mitchell Motorsports, Cunningham Motorsports, and Athenian Motorsports in 2016. Since then, he has been without a ride in any NASCAR series.

Racing career

After making his ARCA debut at Nashville, Mason Mitchell Motorsports announced that Boswell would run an additional six races with the team in the No. 98 car, which were the first Pocono race, Michigan, Iowa, IRP, Kentucky, and Kansas. However, team owner Mason Mitchell ended up driving the car at Kansas instead. Also, he drove at Talladega in the No. 22 Dodge for Cunningham Motorsports, the car that won that race the previous year with Blake Jones driving. He would go on to earn a top-10 finish after qualifying ninth for the race.

When John Wes Townley got a concussion before the Truck Series race at Eldora, Boswell was selected to fill in for him that weekend in his Athenian Motorsports team's No. 05 Chevrolet. In his series debut, he started 16th and finished 21st. Boswell ran one more race for the team at Homestead that year, when Townley was injured again, this time to his ankle. He qualified in the top-10 (starting ninth) and finished 19th and on the lead lap at the end of the race. That race ended up being Athenian Motorsports' last race because they ended up shutting down over the offseason when Townley announced his retirement from racing.

Personal life
He is from Watkinsville, Georgia, which is the same town where John Wes Townley is from, which is the reason Townley picked him to fill in for him at the truck race at Eldora in 2016 when he was injured with a concussion.

He decided not to race in 2015 and instead attend college full-time at the University of North Georgia.

In 2017, he joined the Shade Foundation as an ambassador for their foundation, which raises awareness to children about skin cancer and sun safety.

He is not related to current NASCAR crew chief and former driver Richard Boswell.

Motorsports career results

NASCAR
(key) (Bold – Pole position awarded by qualifying time. Italics – Pole position earned by points standings or practice time. * – Most laps led.)

Camping World Truck Series

 Season still in progress 
 Ineligible for series points

ARCA Racing Series
(key) (Bold – Pole position awarded by qualifying time. Italics – Pole position earned by points standings or practice time. * – Most laps led.)

References

External links
 
 

Living people
1997 births
NASCAR drivers
ARCA Menards Series drivers
Racing drivers from Georgia (U.S. state)
People from Watkinsville, Georgia